The 2019–20 Coupe de France preliminary rounds, Corsica was the qualifying competition to decide which teams from the leagues of the Corsica region of France took part in the main competition from the seventh round.

Two teams qualified from the Corsica preliminary rounds. In 2018–19, SC Bastia progressed the furthest in the main competition, reaching the round of 16 before losing to Caen after a penalty shoot-out.

Schedule
The opening round of the qualifying competition, analogous to the second round, took place on 1 September 2019. 14 teams from Régional 1 (tier 6) and below entered at this stage, with 12 given byes to the third round.  

The third round draw took place on 5 September 2019. The four teams from Championnat National 3 (tier 5) entered at this stage. One team, Oriente FC, were given a bye to the fourth round. 

The fourth round draw took place on 19 September 2019. The single team from Championnat National 2 (tier 4) entered at this stage, and six ties were drawn.

The fifth round draw took place on 3 October 2019. The two teams from Championnat National (tier 3) entered at this stage, and four ties were drawn.

The sixth round draw took place on 17 October 2019, with two ties drawn.

Second round
The preliminary rounds in Corsica start with the second round due to the relatively low number of teams competing.

These matches were played on 1 September 2019.

Third round
These matches were played on 15 September 2019.

Fourth round
These matches were played on 29 September 2019.

Fifth round
These matches were played on 12 and 13 October 2019.

Sixth round
These matches were played on 26 and 27 October 2019.

References

Preliminary rounds